Sophie Bruehmann (born June 15, 1995) is a German female acrobatic gymnast. Along with her partner, Nikolai Rein, she competed in the 2014 Acrobatic Gymnastics World Championships.

References

1995 births
Living people
German acrobatic gymnasts
Female acrobatic gymnasts
European Games competitors for Germany
Gymnasts at the 2015 European Games